Brenda Glynis Williams (born 6 December 1949) is a South African former cricketer who played as a right-handed batter and right-arm off break bowler. She appeared in two Test matches for South Africa in 1972, both against New Zealand, and scored the side's second century in Women's Test matches, scoring 100 her second match. She played domestic cricket for Southern Transvaal.

References

External links
 
 

1949 births
Living people
Cricketers from Johannesburg
South African women cricketers
South Africa women Test cricketers
Central Gauteng women cricketers